The SPARCstation LX (Sun 4/30) is a workstation that was designed, manufactured, and sold by Sun Microsystems. Introduced in November 1992, it is based on the sun4m architecture and enclosed in a lunchbox chassis. It shares the code name Sunergy with the low-end range of SPARCclassic, SPARCclassic X, and SPARCstation ZX.

Specifications

CPU support
The SPARCstation LX incorporates a single 50 MHz microSPARC processor.

Memory 
The SPARCstation LX has three banks with two DSIMM slots each. The official maximum configuration uses 16MB modules, but the first bank can also hold 32MB modules giving a maximum of 128MB memory.

Disk drives 
The SPARCstation LX can hold one internal 3.5-inch 50-pin, single ended, fast-narrow SCSI drive and a floppy drive. It also supports external SCSI devices. There is no IDE/ATAPI support.

Network support
The SPARCstation LX comes with an on-board AMD Lance Ethernet chipset providing 10BASE-T networking as standard and 10Base2 and 10Base5 via an AUI transceiver. The OpenBoot ROM is able to boot from network, using RARP and TFTP. Like all other SPARCstation systems, the SPARCstation LX holds system information such as MAC address and serial number in NVRAM. If the battery on this chip dies, then the system will not be able to boot, but it is possible to set a MAC address manually on each boot.

Operating systems
The following operating systems will run on a SPARCstation LX:
SunOS 4.1.3c onwards
Solaris 2.3 Edition II to Solaris 9
Linux - Some but not all distribution still support this sparc32 sub-architecture
NetBSD/sparc32
OpenBSD/sparc32

Differences between ZX and LX 
The SPARCstation ZX is a SPARCstation LX with a Sun ZX "Leo" 24-bit color framebuffer.

Differences between Classic and LX 
The SPARCstation LX has an accelerated CG6 framebuffer compared to the SPARCclassic's CG3.  The LX also features 16-bit audio as opposed to 8-bit audio for the SPARCclassic.  The motherboards of the two systems are otherwise similar, and both use the same chassis.

See also
 SPARCstation IPC
 SPARCstation IPX
 SPARCstation
 SPARCclassic

References

External links
 Obsolyte: SPARCstation Classic and LX
 Specifications and photos for SPARCstation LX
 Official Sun Documentation

Sun workstations
SPARC microprocessor products